Amir Ali Khan was one of the four Subedars in the Hyderabad district during the erstwhile Nizam's rule.

Amir Ali Khan died in 1987. He was also the president of the All India Pensioner's Association. He is remembered as the father of pensioners in India. His house is located on the Malakpet Junction-Dabeerpura, flyover stretch.

Early life and education 
Subedar Amir Ali Khan Sahab was born on November 16, 1901 in Hyderabad. His father's name was Sardar Ali Khan Sahab. He joined Hyderabad Civil Services (HCS) (Equivalent to the present IAS) in the year 1918.He completed his early education in Hyderabad itself. He completed his matriculation in 1916. He joined the Nizam College in 1916. After Graduation he was selected for the Hyderabad Civil Services (HCS) (Equivalent to the IAS) in 1918. In 1919 he joined the Nizam College, Hyderabad to study for the HCS. Despite the very short time available to him for the very tough HCS final exam, Amir Ali Khan passed the Hyderabad Civil Service(HCS) examination in 1919 from the Nizam College, Hyderabad with high marks.

Achievements 
Subedar Amir Ali Khan in the context of his contribution to the country and services to mankind, irrespective of caste and creed, can rightly be called an Apostle of Peace in no uncertain terms.

Walker gold Medal 
Amir Ali Khan was selected for Hyderabad Civil Services in 1918; he passed the HCS examination in 1919 and was awarded

the Walker gold Medal. Amir Ali Khan received his training in Central Provinces, where got the honor of first division in the revenue

examination.He was actually second in order of merit, but due to the first ranker, Syed Muhammad Abbas’s unfortunate demise the

training itself, Amir Ali Khan became the top ranker among all those who appeared for the exam in 1918-19”

Presentation of  Sipasnama by Ligayat leaders 

In recognition of his historic efforts to resolve a potentially deadly dispute in an amicable manner, the Lingayat leaders organized a public meeting at Gulbarga Head Quarters in 1942 to felicitate the Subedar Saab and to offer him a Sipas nama. (A written document, of an address usually on a velvet cloth, acknowledging and thanksgiving for the services and achievements of someone)

Below is an English translation of the Sipas-nama

For the kind perusal of Nawab Moulvi Mohammad Amir Ali Khan Sahib, H.C.S., Subedar Gulbarga Shareef.

Your Honor!

Though your period of rule has proved a God Gift for the people of Gulbarga and the people of the Suba, irrespective of caste and creed, who have not only benefited by your good governance and prudence but also your  memorable deed shall remain for ever in the hearts of Lingayat Community as a valuable asset and that deed is the construction of the compound wall of the shrine of Shri Sharan Basappa Maharaj, because it is not a secret to your Honour that this sublime shrine is highly venerated and revered by the Lingayat community and which is a holy place for all and a famous center of pilgrimage.

Your Honor! The construction of the compound wall of this temple was a bone of contention between the Hindus and Muslims of this town for long and every one of your predecessors tried his best to solve this problem but their efforts failed. But your sagacity and wisdom, unique statesmanship and unequalled intelligence and diplomacy solved this enigmatic problem very successfully, and instead of following of orders, your infallible strategy and distinctive nature coupled with your innate courteous behavior, prevailed upon both Hindus and Muslims to bury this dispute by mutual consent. Your achievement with your, shrewdness and many sided personality is not only a cause of pride and joy for H.E.H. the Nizam’s Government but it is also an example of communal amity and administrative acumen for various towns of India which has added a new and golden chapter to the history of religious tolerance of H.E.H. the Nizam’s Government.

Your Honor! For the gratifying treatment meted out by you to the Lingayat Community, we take the honour of thanking you and hope that the appraising eye of our Lord H.E.H. The Nizam will provide you a berth in the cabinet for the welfare of the country and nation.

Your Honor! As a mark of our joy for your kind visit and honoring us, we present a humble amount of Rs.3100/- to Your Honor. Though it is a very humble Nazrana but by your benignity and favors, we are sure that Your Honor will accept this small present as a token of our sincere feelings and sentiments. These traits of yours are inherent in you.

Respected Sir, the source of civilization and culture, and peace and tranquility, from which we are being benefited/blessed from is the sun of kingdom. i.e. H.E.H. the Nizam. from whom every one of this country’s communities and religions is getting benefited. We too have imbued the religious tolerance and favors of the Asfia dynasty in general and H.E.H the Nizam in particular, through our loyalty to the throne.

May His Exalted Highness’s shadow never grow less.

Positions Held 

 Subedar of Suba Gulbarga, 1941-1943
 Subedar of Suba Medak, 1943-1945
 Subedar of Suba Warangal 1945-194
 First Mayor of Hyderabad
 Founder, Rehmathia Girls School, Chanchalguda.
 Member, Tafseer-e-Quran Committee.
 Member, Rotary Club of Hyderabad,
 Grand Master, Freemason’s Lodge, 50, at Gosha Mahal Baradari, Hyderabad.
 Member, Mehdi Nawaz Jung Cancer Hospital  Board.
 Founder President, All India Pensioners’ Association
 Senior member - board of revenue Hyderabad

List of contributions

Fund for the victims of war and war widows 
Subedar Amir Ali Khan mobilized a huge relief fund for the wounded soldiers and the war widows in the districts that were under him. The amount that was collected due to his personal efforts was unbelievably such a huge amount of Rupees 3,75,000 (An amount equivalent to almost Rs. 37.00Crores at the present purchasing power of the Rupee.) providing each war widow with an opportunity to financially survive.  A purse of Rupees 3,75,000 was handed over to Mrs. Savidge, wife of the Hon’ble Mr. Savidge, Revenue Member by Mr. G. Ramachari, an Advocate and non-official Vice President of the Suba War Committee at a supper given on Tuesday night in their honor by Mr. Amir Ali Khan, the Subedar of Medak. The sum represents the contributions made by the people of the Suba in the short space of 21 /2 months in response to the appeal issued by the Subedar sahib for funds and recruits of the prosecution of the war. The appeal was made on 27th. March and the campaign for monetary collections closed on 15 June. The purse was presented to Mrs. Savidge to be utilized in any way she desired for any purpose or charity connected with the war. Out of this total Nalgonda district contributed Rs. 1, 70,000, Medak Rs. 80,000, Nizamabad Rs. 66,600.  And Mahbubnagar, Rs. 61,000.

Offered 14 Acres of his private self acquired land to Royal Air Force 
During the period and after the Second World War, Subebar Amir Ali Khan, being a Democrat and a true Secularist at heart, braced himself again to offer help fight Adolf Hitler’s racist Nazis of Germany, the Anarchist Fascists of Mussolini’s Italy and Imperialist Japan by raising and allocating large funds for the recruitment of soldier fighters from Hyderabad to battle in the fields and jungles of Africa, Burma, Thailand Etc., alongside the British Army and the other Allied Forces. Subedar Amir Ali Khan offered to the Royal Air Force 14 Acres of his private self acquired land at Ameerpet in Hyderabad free of cost, (in spite of the Princess Durru Shehwar the Nizam’s elder daughter-in-law, offering to pay him the full rent of his lands) for establishing the Rest and Recreation(R & R) facilities for the Royal Air Force who are given a rest period of one or two weeks in between their continuous tours and military training periods.

Establishing Fighters’ Fund 

During the period and after the end of the Second World War, Subedar Amir Ali Khan, being a Democrat and a true Secularist at heart, braced himself again to offer help fight Adolf Hitler’s Racist Nazis of Germany, the Anarchist Fascists of Mussolini’s Italy and established a large  Fighters’ Fund, through public donations and through which a large number of Indian soldiers were recruited by paying their families an advance of a huge sum Rs. 20,000 each in cash, (the amount in today’s prices would be equal to about Rs. 400,000 at the least) and were trained and armed for battle against the Japanese in the war theatres of Burma, Singapore and Philippines Etc. as well as the Italian, German and other Axis Forces  in the war theatres of Africa, Arabia, Gibraltar and Malta Etc. alongside the British Army and other Allied Forces.

Taking Initiative and solving Sharana Basappa / Basaweshwara Temple dispute between Hindus and Muslims 

There were sixteen districts of Hyderabad State, one of the districts was Gulbarga Shareef, the last resting place of the famous Sufi Saint, Khwaja Banda Nawaz (Now in Karnataka state). In this city there is a big Lingayat community temple by the name “Sharan Basappa”

During  Saab’s tenure as Subedar at Gulbarga the bitter dispute between the Hindus and Muslims over the “Bassappa Temple” lands came to a head. Subedar Amir Ali Khan made up his mind that this will not continue to assail Hindu – Muslim communal harmony and he decided to intervene in the matter.

According to authentic histrionic, the property in dispute was believed to be the compound wall around the Sharan Basappa Temple, Hindus claimed the compound wall while Muslims contended the property belonged to the nearby Khwaja Bande Nawaz Dargah premises. For more than two decades, the issue kept both the communities in opposition, with religious fervor being an impetus. Many government officials avoided addressing the communal fray. While the situation could have been turned violent and the confrontation between the two communities, it did not. Subedar Saab intervened.He realized the Hindu/Muslim communities of Gulbarga were attempting to start a war like battle over the issues.

Subedar saab took the initiative under his own stream and brought the local leaders of both communities to the negotiating table to find the truth. With his judicious foresight and administrative competence, he also called the leaders of both the communities; prominent among them was Nawab Bahadur Yar Jung the fire brand Majlis-e-Ittehad-ul-Muslimeen leader, Mr.Mallikarjunappa, president of the Lingayat Conference and the Lingayat leader spearheading the campaign for the Bassappa Temple, the Mutawalli and Sajjada Nasheen of the Gulbarga Khwaja Bande Nawaz Dargah as well as some prominent local Hindus and Muslims and other neutral parties, to sit across the table along with the officials of revenue and the land records department. Subedar Amir Ali Khan didn’t want to let the issue prolonged and wrote a letter to Mr.Abdul Kareem Sahib Timmapuri, member Majlis-e-Ittehad-ul-Muslimeen giving details of the case and requested nawab Bahadur Yar Jung, the president of Majlis-e-Ittehad-ul-Muslimeen to settle the simmering issue between the Hindus and Muslims of Gulbarga.

Took necessary precautions to fight the Tujalpur Epidemic in Gulbarga 

After Subedar Amir Ali Khan took over the reins of Suba Gulbarga (in the then Hyderabad State) in 1937 the Tuljapur Epidemic broke out. Tuljapur (now in Maharashtra) is known for its philosophical stories associated with the famous Tuljapur Temple. Hundreds of Thousands of people from all over India throng to this Temple Town every year to participate in the Annual Jatra held on a particular day of the year.

More than 100,000 Pilgrims attend the Jatra, drawn from four corners of India. None of the previous district officials had made any special arrangements to provide the necessary amenities to such a large number of Pilgrims as well the thousands of Vendors, Hawkers, Thhela Bandi Wallahs, Food and Snacks Sellers, Toy Sellers, Giant Wheel and other Playground Equipment Wallahs, Magicians, Snake Charmers, Musicians, Soothsayers, Singers, Dancers, Monkey Wallahs, Bear Wallahs, Jokers, Story Tellers, Conjurers, Con Men, Hakims, Vaids, Quacks and God Men who keep a track of_ and survive on the business generated during_ such Jatras, Urs’ and Melas being conducted in quick succession at one Temple Dargah or the other in different places throughout the country on different dates almost throughout the year.

While the situation with regard to planning and provision of Pilgrim amenities, safety, health and hygiene in other such Pilgrimage centers was nothing to boast about it was particularly grim in Tuljapur. In addition to these problems, there used to be traffic chaos while trekking over the dingy, pot holed and just 12 feet wide road leading to the Jatra place. Subedar Saab ordered this road to be widened to 60 feet to ease the traffic jam for the pilgrims.

Lack of safe drinking water, proper sanitation and drainage, open defecations and generally very unhygienic conditions culminated into an Epidemic of Cholera and Plague spread like wild fire.

The Epidemic started spreading with no let up. Subedar Amir Ali Khan took note of the grim situation. And like an Army Commander he hastened to mobilize the state resources to fight the Epidemic he set the tone and pace of the entire Suba administration on a War Footing. Subedar Saab immediately mobilized the Medical and Health wing and all available Doctors and health workers and kept them on their toes until the unfortunate Health Emergency lasted. The services of other departmental employees were also commandeered and they were immediately pressed into relief and rehabilitation work. Wasting no further time, Overhead Water Tanks were ordered to be built. And in order to meet the temporary exigency expediently, Water in Bulk was brought in tankers from adjoining areas.

A special Sanitation and Cleanliness drive was undertaken and the people were advised to take necessary precautions and also to isolate and report even their near and dear ones if any symptoms of Cholera or Plague were noticed in them. They were also being advised to use the Temporary Toilets and Baths built by the Government instead of relieving themselves in the open or taking bath in the fields, near water courses and ponds. Garbage was removed and burnt, dead rats, which are the major Carriers of the Bubonic Plague Virus were destroyed by burning and the remaining live rats were caught in hundreds of Rat Traps that were set up and killed with Rat Poison in a special drive involving the villagers and some volunteer pilgrims. Those that had already contracted the disease were isolated, Quarantined treated and the unaffected were given preventive medicines as were available during those days.

With all these measures, implemented with clockwork precision and at great speed, the Epidemic subsided without taking a further toll of people, apart from those who had already caught the infection and had died before any treatment could reach them.

The total toll in such a major Epidemic in Tuljapur was in Hundreds which could actually have escalated perhaps to thousands, had the Subedar Saab not taken the measures he did and had he not remained in the forefront of this war against the Twin Epidemic day and night and had he not inspired the people and his subordinates to risk their own lives to save hundreds of thousands of Pilgrims by his own personal example.

People heaved a sigh of relief and Subedar Saab got a well deserved respite when the Cholera and Plague Epidemics beat a hasty retreat without leaving a trail of death and destruction they were otherwise capable of.

Accolades

Mrs. Savidge’s reply 

Mrs. Savidge, replying, said that the magnificent purse would go to swell the already great contributions made by the people of this state to the ‘Hyderabad War Purposes Fund’. She was sure that everyone present would wish to join her in thanks giving to the officials and non-officials of the Suba and congratulating them on the splendid results they had achieved. Mrs. Savidge paid tribute to Mr. Amir Ali Khan, the Subedar of Medak for having inspired not only the spirit of giving in the hearts of all those who had contributed to the purse, but also the spirit of co-operation between officials and non-officials of all kinds who had helped him in his effort.

Mrs. Savidge added: “perhaps some of those who have contributed to this fund may feel that as the war in the East has finished so much sooner than our previous most optimistic estimates, they have giving their money unnecessarily. I can assure them that this is not so. This is a most timely contribution which will help to provide amenities and comforts for the troops who must of necessity remain under arms for some time to come, even after hostilities finally cease. It will also be used to relieve distress in the families of those serving abroad who return to civil life without any definite job awaiting them and to help them through the time they will need to readjust themselves to ordinary peace time life.”

Winding up the function Mr. Amir Ali Khan, the Subedar, thanked the guests and said that as a matter of fact the splendid response for war efforts was due to the generous wishes of His Exalted Highness, our august sovereign, to the encouragement of His Excellency the President and to the exceptional popularity of Mr. and Mrs. Savidge. He also thanked all the Taluqdars, Mustafa Ali Khan, Nujmuddin Ansari, Nawab Farhatullah and Kutbuddin Khan, and the non-officials, especially Messrs. Abul Hasan Syed Ali, G. Ramachari and Narasing Rao for the help rendered by them.

The function came to a close with the National Anthems of God Save the King and God Bless the Nizam.

Vice president of the Hyderabad Women’s War Work Lady Tasker’s letter 

Lady Tasker who was the vice president of the Hyderabad Women’s War Work, wrote a letter to Subedar Amir Ali Khan on October 16, 1941, showing her bountiful regard to him and immense joy that he had mobilized such a huge fund for the victims of war in so short a duration that it was really awesome.

No one imagined that a Subedar, in charge of a few districts in Hyderabad State and having no connection whatsoever with the Army or the War, could rise himself voluntarily to international level and raise such huge funds for the relief and rehabilitation work for the war torn people across the world as well as India which ultimately brought him into international focus.

In a great book - Portraits from Memory by R. Vasudev Pillai 
In a book written by R.Vasudev Pillai. from 196th page he written his connection with Subedar sahab and his experiences with him.

In Media

The Hindu

Subedar Ali Khan Road
As per GO Ms No 224 dated February 10, 2009, the government accorded permissionfor naming the Malakpet Junction-Dabeerpura, flyover stretch as "Subedar Amir Ali Khan Road.

Amir Ali Khan Peace and Global Foundation and its Founder

The peace foundation is located in 16-4-777 Subedar house, beside bank of baroda, Subedar Amir Ali Khan rd ,chenchelguda - malakpet, Hyderabad- Telangana, India. To promote, enhance and raise awareness on the importance of peace, education, truth and honesty among people regardless of caste, creed, region or language for a better life and humanity is the main objective of this foundation. Farook Ali Khan son Amir Ali Khan established the foundation. Farook Ali Khan, a dual citizen of United States of America and India, is the third son and the eighth child of Subedar Amir Ali Khan. Farook moved to United States of America after earning his Bachelor’s Degree in Agriculture from Andhra Pradesh Agricultural University. Farook obtained his Masters in Business Administration from the Governors State University in Illinois in 1973.Farook is married to Nadira , a physician and has three children : Rukhaya Ali Khan – an attorney, Hassan Ali Khan – a senior analyst in New York, and Sarah Ali Khan – an attorney.

Members of Foundation 
Mr. Farook Ali Khan, Managing Director, President, Founder

Mr. Hassan Ali Khan, Joint Managing Director and Co-Founder

Nadira Ali Khan, M.D., HealthCare Advisor and Co-Founder

Rukhaya Ali Khan, J.D., Overseas Advisor and Co-Founder

Sarah Ali Khan, Adviser and Co-Founder

Amir Peace Foundation is dedicated to  promoting the  principles of   my late father,     Subedar Amir Ali khan,  for  the purpose of serving the  people  of   the world: striving f or universal  Peace, greater literacy and equal access to opportunities to deprived people for living a better life.   Visitors may use  the APF site for its  utilities  or its information on different subjects -- Farook Ali Khan ( Founder President Farook Ali Khan)

References

1987 deaths
1901 births